Neolamprologus cylindricus is a species of cichlid endemic to Lake Tanganyika where it is only known to occur in the southeastern part of the lake. It prefers to live in recesses in the substrate and eats small benthic invertebrates. It lays its eggs in caves. This species can reach a length of  TL. This species can also be found in the aquarium trade.

References

Konings, A., 1998. Tanganyika cichlids in their natural habitat. Cichlid Press. 272 p. 

Fish described in 1986
Taxa named by Wolfgang Staeck
Taxa named by Lothar Seegers
Fish of Tanzania
Fish of Zambia
cylindricus